Clivina rugosofemoralis is a species of ground beetle in the subfamily Scaritinae. It was described by Balkenohl in 1999.

References

rugosofemoralis
Beetles described in 1999